This is a list of FM radio stations in the United States having call signs beginning with the letters KG through KJ. Low-power FM radio stations, those with designations such as KGAP-LP, have not been included in this list.

KG--

KH--

KI--

KJ--

See also
 North American call sign

FM radio stations in the United States by call sign (initial letters KG-KJ)